Pataḥ  is a Hebrew niqqud vowel sign represented by a horizontal line  underneath a letter. In modern Hebrew, it indicates the phoneme  which is close to the "[a]" sound in the English word far and is transliterated as an a.

In Yiddish orthography, a pataḥ (called pasekh in Yiddish) has two uses. The combination of pasekh with the letter aleph, אַ, is used to represent the vowel [a]; the combination of pasekh with a digraph consisting of two yods, ײַ, is used to represent the diphthong [aj].

Pronunciation
The following table contains the pronunciation and transliteration of the different s in reconstructed historical forms and dialects using the International Phonetic Alphabet. The pronunciation in IPA is above and the transliteration is below.

The letters Bet  and Het  used in this table are only for demonstration. Any letter can be used.

This only occurs at the ends of words, only with pataḥ and only with these three letters.

Vowel length comparison
By adding two vertical dots (shva) the vowel is made very short. However, these vowels lengths are not manifested in Modern Hebrew.

Unicode encoding

See also
Niqqud
Qamatz
Fathah, the related diacritic in Arabic

Niqqud